The first federal elections were held in Germany on 3 March 1871. The National Liberal Party emerged as the largest party in the Reichstag, with 117 of the 382 seats. Voter turnout was just 51.0%.

Results

References

Federal elections in Germany
Germany
1871 elections in Germany
Elections in the German Empire
March 1871 events